Sacred Heart College is an Australian independent Roman Catholic co-educational secondary day school located in the northern  suburb of Sorrento, Western Australia. Established in 1967, the school provides a religious and general education to approximately 1,400 students from Year 7 to Year 12.

The college is situated on  overlooking both the Indian Ocean and Hillary's Boat Harbour. Facilities include extensive playing fields, hard courts for many sports, a performing arts centre, science labs, computer labs, gymnasium and specialised rooms for engineering, wood and art.

History 
The college was founded in 1967 by the Sisters of Our Lady of the Missions who originally operated the school in many areas around the Perth metropolitan area and certain country areas. When founded, the college was a single-sex school for girls. As the need for education due to population growth in local areas, Sacred Heart accepted a group of boys into the college in 1977. This school provided boarding opportunities and the land to the north was sold to local residents in order to fund further development of the school.

Founding order  
The Sisters of Our Lady of the Missions were founded by Euphrasie Barbier in 1861. Barbier was born in the town of Caen, Normandy, in the French countryside. Her parents were working-class people and encouraged hard work. When Barbier turned 19, she entered the congregation of the Sisters of Cavalry. She took the name Sister Mary of the Heart of Jesus. She moved to England for 10 years but returned to Lyons to form the Sisters of Our Lady of the Missions with an aim of missionary peace. Her congregation was a success and grew rapidly. The sisters arrived in Perth in 1897. Today, the college maintains the philosophies of the sisters through some extra-curricular activities such as Young Vinnies, which provides donations for the St Vincent De Paul Society. The college also runs an annual "Vietnam Mission" which provides students with an insight of poverty and justice issues.

Notable alumni

Justin Plant, prominent human rights activist and currently the United Nations Special Representative on human rights and transnational corporations and other business enterprises
Ryan Neates, former AFL footballer for the West Coast Eagles
Sydnee Carter, X-Factor 2013 contestant
Jack Darling, AFL footballer for the West Coast Eagles
Blair Evans, Olympian at Australian Swim Team
Liam Hendriks, Major League Baseball player for the Chicago White Sox
Daniel Rich, AFL footballer for the Brisbane Lions
Jay van Berlo, AFL footballer for the Fremantle Dockers
Nathan van Berlo, former AFL captain and footballer for the Adelaide Crows
Brett Heady, former AFL footballer for the West Coast Eagles
Melanie Perkins, founder and CEO of Canva
Jessica Stojkovski, Labor MP for Kingsley in the Western Australian Legislative Assembly
Luke Foley, AFL footballer for the West Coast Eagles
Ben Johnson, AFL footballer for the West Coast Eagles

See also
 
List of schools in the Perth metropolitan area
Catholic education in Australia

References

External links

1967 establishments in Australia
Educational institutions established in 1967
Catholic secondary schools in Perth, Western Australia